Television network, play-by-play and color commentator for the Orange Bowl from 1953 to the present.

Television 
ESPN televised the Orange Bowl game from 2011–2014, as part of the cable network's $500 million broadcast deal with the BCS. ESPN will continue to televise the Orange Bowl through December 31, 2025 as part of its broadcast deal with the College Football Playoff.  The Orange Bowl and Fiesta Bowl are the only two bowl games ever to air on all the "big 4" broadcast television networks in the United States (ABC, CBS, NBC and Fox).

Spanish

In 2013, ESPN Deportes will provide the first Spanish U.S. telecast of the Orange Bowl.

Radio

Local radio

References

Broadcasters
Orange
Orange Bowl
Orange Bowl
Orange Bowl
Orange Bowl
Orange Bowl
Orange Bowl